Ricky Havili-Heimuli is a former American football defensive tackle. He was signed by the Jacksonville Jaguars after being undrafted in 2014. He played college football at Oregon.

High school

College career

Professional career

Jacksonville Jaguars
After going unselected in the 2014 NFL Draft, Havili-Heimuli signed with the Jacksonville Jaguars on May 12, 2014. He was waived on August 29.

Atlanta Falcons
On November 18, 2014, Atlanta Falcons signed Havili-Heimuli to their practice squad.

References

External links
Atlanta Falcons bio
Oregon Ducks bio

Living people
Players of American football from Utah
Oregon Ducks football players
American football defensive tackles
Jacksonville Jaguars players
People from Kane County, Utah
1991 births
American people of Tongan descent